R. Kent Dybvig is a professor of computer science at Indiana University Bloomington, in Bloomington, Indiana. His research focuses on programming languages, and he is the principal developer of the optimizing Chez Scheme compiler and runtime system which were initially released in 1985. Together with Daniel P. Friedman, he has long advocated the use of the Scheme language in teaching computer science. He is now professor emeritus, having retired from Indiana University (IU) to join Cisco in 2011.

For his contributions to both the practical and theoretical aspects of computing and information technology, in particular his design and development of Chez Scheme, the Association for Computing Machinery (ACM) named Dybvig a Distinguished Member in 2006, the first year the association awarded distinguished ranks.

Books

References

External links
 
 
 

Indiana University faculty
Programming language researchers
Living people
Distinguished Members of the ACM
Year of birth missing (living people)